Knowing is the third studio album by Hong Kong singer Hubert Wu. It was released by Voice Entertainment on 2 December 2015. It was available for pre-order on 24 November 2015.

Track listing

Music video

Soundtrack appearances

Chart performance

Singles

Other charted songs

Awards

Out of My League 
 2014 Metro Hit Awards – Best Original Song
 2015 Music King Awards – Best Original Song

The Truth 
 2015 Jade Solid Gold Songs Selection Part 1 – Winning Song
 2015 StarHub TVB Awards – My Favorite Soundtrack
 2015 Jade Solid Gold Best 10 Awards Presentation – Jade Solid Gold Best 10 Songs

Knowing 
 2015 Jade Solid Gold Songs Selection Part 2 – Winning Song
 2015 Jade Solid Gold Best 10 Awards Presentation – Best Re-imagined Song
 2015 Jade Solid Gold Best 10 Awards Presentation – Jade Solid Gold Best 10 Songs
 2015 Metro Hit Awards – Metro Hit Songs
 2015 TVB8 Mandarin Music On Demand Awards Presentation – Top Mandarin Songs
 2015 Hong Kong Music Video Selection Part 3 – Winning MV
 2015 Hong Kong Music Video Awards Presentation – Popular Music Video of the Year (Bronze Award)
 2016 Music King Awards – Cantonese Gold Song
 2016 Canadian Chinese Pop Music Chart G-Hit Awards – Top 10 Cantonese Songs

Let Me Let Go 
 2016 Jade Solid Gold Songs Selection Part 1 – Winning Song 
 3rd Cantopop Songs Chart Awards Presentation – Best Music Video

Like Awakening 
 2016 Jade Solid Gold Songs Selection Part 1 – Winning Song

References 

Hubert Wu albums
2015 albums